The Galloping Ace is a 1924 American silent Western film directed by Robert N. Bradbury and written by Isadore Bernstein. The film stars Jack Hoxie, Margaret Morris, Robert McKim, Frank Rice, Julia Brown, and Dorothea Wolbert. The film was released on March 31, 1924, by Universal Pictures.

Plot
As described in a film magazine review, Jim Jordan, an ex-cowboy and service man, obtains a job on Anne Morse's ranch where his buddy, Zack  Williams, is working. Kincaid, owner of an adjoining quarry, plots to get possession of  the Morse land, which contains valuable black marble deposits. Failing to foreclose an illegal mortgage, Kincaid attempts to take the land by force. Kincaid's schemes are defeated and Jordan weds Anne.

Cast

References

External links
 

1924 films
1920s English-language films
1924 Western (genre) films
Universal Pictures films
Films directed by Robert N. Bradbury
American black-and-white films
Silent American Western (genre) films
1920s American films